The Kingdom of Steel: The Very Best of Manowar is a compilation album by the heavy metal band Manowar. It was released Feb 2, 1999 by MCA International.

Track listing 
 "Manowar"
 "Blood of my Enemies"
 "Kill With Power"
 "Sign of the Hammer"
 "Courage"
 "Fighting the World"
 "Kings of Metal"
 "Metal Warriors"
 "Heart of Steel"
 "Number One"
 "The Gods Made Heavy Metal"
 "Hail and Kill"
 "Warlord"
 "The Power"
 "Battle Hymn"
 "The Crown and the Ring"

Charts

External links
[ Billboard.com]

References 

1999 greatest hits albums
Manowar albums